Micrepeira is a genus of orb-weaver spiders first described by E. Schenkel in 1953.

Species
 it contains seven species:
Micrepeira albomaculata Schenkel, 1953 – Venezuela
Micrepeira fowleri Levi, 1995 – Colombia, Ecuador, Peru, Brazil
Micrepeira hoeferi Levi, 1995 – Peru, Brazil, French Guiana
Micrepeira pachitea Levi, 1995 – Peru
Micrepeira smithae Levi, 1995 – Suriname
Micrepeira tubulofaciens (Hingston, 1932) – Colombia, Guyana, French Guiana
Micrepeira velso Levi, 1995 – Costa Rica

References

Araneidae
Araneomorphae genera
Spiders of South America
Spiders of the Caribbean